The mayor of Alexandria is elected in November every three years.

The current mayor is Justin Wilson. He was elected for a first term in 2018 and was reelected to a second term in 2021.

2012

General election
Incumbent Mayor Bill Euille faced Andrew Macdonald.  Macdonald had previously served as a Democratic member of the city council between 2003 and 2007 and had run as an independent candidate in 2000. Despite being elected vice mayor by receiving the most votes in the 2006 election, Macdonald resigned from the council in 2007 for personal reasons. In March 2012, Macdonald appeared before the Alexandria Republican Committee and asked for their support in a potential bid for Mayor. Known for his anti-development views, Macdonald said he would make opposition to development on Alexandria's waterfront central to his campaign. Macdonald opposed the project both on environmental grounds while he also charged that Euille had business relationships with current waterfront tenants. Republicans responded favorably to Macdonald's appearance, with Republican Vice Mayor Bill Cleveland saying "I'm voting for anybody but Bill Euille." Several days later, following a confrontation with Alexandria Democratic Committee leadership, Macdonald resigned his membership in the Democratic Committee. On March 9, Macdonald officially announced his run for mayor as an independent.

Though defeated, Macdonald won majorities of the vote in two of the three precincts that bounded on the waterfront area.

2015

Democratic primary
The Democratic primary was held June 9, 2015. Vice-mayor Silberberg, a relative political newcomer, unseated longtime mayor Euille, and also defeated former mayor Donley, in what was regarded to be an upset victory.

General election
The general election was held on November 3, 2015. Allison Silberberg defeated incumbent mayor Bill Euille, who ran as a write-in after his defeat in the Democratic primary.

2018

Democratic primary
The Democratic primary was held on June 18. Vice-mayor Justin Wilson won the Democratic primary, unseating first-term incumbent Allison Silberberg in what was regarded to be an upset victory.

General election
Wilson was unopposed on the ballot, however write-in votes were cast. Combined voter turnout in Alexandria during the mayoral election and coinciding races was 70.48%, and turnout in the mayoral election alone was 58.51%.

2021

Democratic primary
The Democratic primary was held on June 8, 2021. Incumbent Mayor Justin Wilson defeated his predecessor, Allison Silberberg, in a rematch of the 2018 election.

References